Nazar Qoli (also Romanized as Naz̧ar Qolī; also known as Nazar-Kalekh and Nazar Qal‘eh) is a village in Howmeh Rural District, in the Central District of Khodabandeh County, Zanjan Province, Iran. At the 2006 census, its population was 1,043, in 233 families.

References 

Populated places in Khodabandeh County